Victor Scipion Charles Auguste de La Garde de Chambonas (1750–1830) was a mayor of Sens, brigadier general, and French foreign minister, at the beginning of the French Revolution.

He was born in Paris, the son of Scipion Louis Joseph de La Garde, Marquis de Chambonas (1765) and of Louise Victoire Grimoard de Beauvoir du Roure.  He married Josephine Louise Aurélie Aglaé Aimée de Lespinasse (1756–1788) on 4 May 1774 in Paris; they had a son, Adolphe Aimé Charles (1778–1860).

He was Minister of Foreign Affairs from 17 June to 23 July 1792 in the Government of Louis XVI. 
After 10 August 1792, he emigrated to London where he worked as a goldsmith, was sued for debts and sent to a debtors' prison. He returned to France in 1814 and died in Paris in 1830.

References

1750 births
1830 deaths
French Foreign Ministers
French emigrants to the Kingdom of Great Britain
Politicians from Paris